The Municipal Gymnasium is a public gym located at 2111 Pan American Plaza in San Diego's Balboa Park, in the U.S. state of California.

References

External links

 

Balboa Park (San Diego)
Buildings and structures in San Diego
Gyms in the United States